Kyle Edmund was the defending champion but chose not to defend his title.

Renzo Olivo won the title after defeating Leonardo Mayer 2–6, 7–6(7–3), 7–6(7–3) in the final.

Seeds

Draw

Finals

Top half

Bottom half

References
Main Draw
Qualifying Draw

Copa Fila - Singles